Bethany, Kentucky may refer to:

Bethany, Wolfe County, Kentucky, an unincorporated community
Bethany, Louisville, a neighborhood of Louisville, Kentucky